Tamara Myers (Miah) (born 27 July 1993) is a Bahamian athlete specialising in the triple jump. She represented her country at the 2017 World Championships without advancing to the final.

International competitions

Personal bests
Following are the personal bests

Outdoor
Long jump – 6.51 (Kingston 2017)
Triple jump – 14.03 (+1.0 m/s, Philadelphia 2017) NR

Indoor
Long jump – 6.33 (Fayetteville 2015)
Triple jump – 13.40 (Fayetteville 2015)

References

External links
 World Athletics Bio
 Razorbacks Bio

1993 births
Living people
Bahamian female triple jumpers
Bahamian female long jumpers
World Athletics Championships athletes for the Bahamas
Athletes (track and field) at the 2014 Commonwealth Games
Athletes (track and field) at the 2018 Commonwealth Games
Commonwealth Games competitors for the Bahamas
Athletes (track and field) at the 2015 Pan American Games
Athletes (track and field) at the 2019 Pan American Games
Pan American Games competitors for the Bahamas
People from Andros, Bahamas